Tricholoma colossus is a mushroom of the agaric genus Tricholoma. Due to its ringed foot, it was previously classified as Armillaria, even though it is otherwise clearly Tricholoma. The cap is 6–30 cm wide, brick red to chestnut brown, hemispherical when young, widening later on, uneven, always with very thick flesh, surface slightly sticky, developing somewhat into scales. The stipe is thick, 2–5 (at the stem even 10) cm thick, solid. Ring-like formation at the top of the foot, above which it is white. Grows in pine forests to September to October; very rare.

See also
List of North American Tricholoma
List of Tricholoma species

References

colossus
Fungi described in 1836
Fungi of Europe
Fungi of North America